Dibrova is a village in Ternopil Raion of Ternopil Oblast, Ukraine. It belongs to Zbarazh urban hromada, one of the hromadas of Ukraine.

Until 18 July 2020, Dibrova belonged to Zbarazh Raion. The raion was abolished in July 2020 as part of the administrative reform of Ukraine, which reduced the number of raions of Ternopil Oblast to three. The area of Zbarazh Raion was split between Kremenets and Ternopil Raions, with Dibrova being transferred to Ternopil Raion.

Sources

Villages in Ternopil Raion
Zbarazh urban hromada